Walter Baine Grieve (April 19, 1850 – February 3, 1921) was a merchant and political figure in Newfoundland. He represented Bonavista Bay from 1882 to 1883 and Trinity Bay from 1885 to 1889 in the Newfoundland and Labrador House of Assembly.

He was born in St. John's, the son of James Johnston Grieve. In 1872, he became manager of Baine Johnstons, a fishery supply firm also involved in the seal fishery. On April 6, 1880 in Gateshead, England he married Ellen Marion Stone. His election to the assembly in 1882 was declared void in the following year. Grieve served as a member of the Legislative Council in 1894 and from 1919 to 1921. He became a director of the Union Bank in 1894. In 1918, he was named to the Order of the British Empire. Grieve died in St. John's at the age of 70.

References

External links 
 

Members of the Newfoundland and Labrador House of Assembly
1850 births
1921 deaths
Newfoundland Colony people
Members of the Legislative Council of Newfoundland
Members of the Order of the British Empire
Politicians from St. John's, Newfoundland and Labrador